Saint Durbalnath was an nineteenth century Indian Hindu saint. He was born at "Bichgaav" of Alwardistrict in Rajasthan. Durbalnath ji is considered as"kulguru" of Hindu Khatik community. Many temples of Durbalnath ji are situated all across India, but the most famous temple is situated at Bandikui town of dausa district in Rajasthan. Every year "Gyanoprakash mahautsav" is celebrated on Kartik purnima at Bandikui temple.

Early life

The details of Durbalnath's life are not well known because he was from a backward caste family and at that time members of his caste's birth were not recorded by the Brahmin scholars. His spiritual guru was shri Garibnath Ji.

References 

Indian Hindu saints

Hindi-language poets